Finnfacts is a Finnish media organisation. It promotes Finnish know-how by organizing international media visits and publishing the Good News from Finland news site.

Finnfacts is part of Business Finland. Finnfacts’ activities are financed by the Confederation of Finnish Industries EK and the Finnish Ministry of Employment and the Economy.

References

Trade associations based in Finland